Zdechovice is name of several places in the Czech Republic:

 Zdechovice (Hradec Králové District), a village
 Zdechovice (Pardubice District), a village